Ousmane Farota is a Malian international football goalkeeper. He played primarily for Stade Malien.

Farota was a stalwart of the national side in the late 1980s and early 1990s and played in the African Nations Cup in 1994. His performances earned him considerable praise and he was voted the tournament's outstanding goalkeeper.

References

Living people
Malian footballers
Mali international footballers
1994 African Cup of Nations players
Stade Malien players
Association football goalkeepers
Year of birth missing (living people)
21st-century Malian people